Oskar Trautmann (7 May 1877 – 10 December 1950) was a German diplomat and writer.

Diplomatic career
In 1904, Trautmann entered the German Ministry of Foreign Affairs. In 1905 he was appointed Vice Consul in St. Petersburg, Russia. In 1907 he served as Secretary of the German delegation to the Hague Peace Conference. In 1911 he left his position in St. Petersburg and joined manpower division of the Ministry of Foreign Affairs. In 1913 was appointed Consul General in Zürich, Switzerland. After the First World War, he filled positions that were related to the Far East. In 1921 was appointed Consul General in Kobe, Japan. In 1922 was appointed Councillor of the Embassy in Tokyo.

Between 1935-1938 he served as Ambassador to China, serving in Nanjing, where he attempted to mediate the 2nd Sino-Japanese War.

Works
 Trautmann, Oskar, Der Diplomat - Der Konsul (Berlin: Lehrmittelzentralt d. DAF. 1938)
 "Russia and the Great War 1914-1917" The XX Century (journal published in Shanghai)
 Mitter, Rana. Forgotten Ally: China's World War II, 1937-1945. 2013.

Sources
 Brief biography at the Bundesarchiv (German) 

1877 births
1950 deaths
Ambassadors of Germany to China
Delegates to the Hague Peace Conferences